The 2007 Ogun State gubernatorial election was the 6th gubernatorial election of Ogun State. Held on April 14, 2007, the People's Democratic Party nominee Gbenga Daniel won the election, defeating Ibikunle Amosun of the All Nigeria Peoples Party.

Results 
A total of 18 candidates contested in the election. Gbenga Daniel from the People's Democratic Party won the election, defeating Ibikunle Amosun from the All Nigeria Peoples Party. Registered voters was 1,466,308.

References 

Ogun State gubernatorial elections
Ogun gubernatorial
April 2007 events in Nigeria